Shannon Pluhowsky is an American left-handed ten-pin bowler who competes in the Professional Women's Bowling Association (PWBA) and internationally. Pluhowsky is a 21-time member of Team USA (2001–2021), and a former four-time member of Junior Team USA (2000–2003). Pluhowsky has six professional championships, including major wins at the 2006 USBC Queens in Reno, Nevada, the 2014 BPAA Women's All-Star in Rockford, Illinois, and the 2021 PWBA Tour Championship in Reno, Nevada.

Early life and college career 
Pluhowsky was born on August 8, 1982 in Dayton, Ohio. Before her successful professional career she had a successful amateur and college career. When she was younger she was a three-time Junior Gold Champion and a USOC World Bowler of the Year in 2004. She bowled at the University of Nebraska under coach Bill Straub who is credited for Pluhowsky's impeccable left-handed form. She sports a big push-away and a straight and loose swing with a textbook finishing position. She will still consult Straub to this day if she is struggling with her form.

At Nebraska, Pluhowsky was a first-team All-American in three of her four seasons, and second-team All-American in the other season. She was NCBCA Rookie of the Year and Player of the Year in the 2001–02 season, and was awarded Player of the Year again in the 2004–05 season. Shannon won the Intercollegiate Singles Championship in 2004, and her Nebraska team won two NCAA Bowling Championships (2004 and 2005).

Career accomplishments and accolades under Team USA 

 One gold medal (trios), one silver medal (team) and three bronze medals (singles, doubles, all-events) at 2018 PABCON Women's Championships
 Bronze medal at 2016 World Bowling Singles Championships
 Two gold medals (trios, Masters) at 2016 PABCON Women's Championships
 One gold medal (doubles) at the 2016 PABCON Champion of Champions
 One gold medal (team) at 2015 World Bowling Women's Championships
 One gold medal (singles) and one silver medal (doubles) at 2015 Pan American Games
 One gold medal (team) at 2014 PABCON Championships
 Four gold medals at 2011 World Championships  (doubles, trios, team, Masters)
 2002 and 2004 AMF World Cup champion

Professional career 
Pluhowsky has two PWBA titles, both majors. She won the 2006 USBC Queens, which occurred during the PWBA Tour's hiatus (2004 to 2014), but was retroactively credited as a PWBA title. Following her best finish at a major in several years (third at the 2021 U.S. Open), Shannon won the season-ending PWBA Tour Championship on October 31, 2021 for her second PWBA Tour title and second major. The tournament, which awarded a $50,000 first prize, was contested at the site of Pluhowsky's first major championship: the National Bowling Stadium in Reno, Nevada. Looking to repeat as champion in the 2022 PWBA Tour Championship, Pluhowsky qualified as the #1 seed but was defeated in the championship match by #3 seed Stephanie Zavala.

Her other professional titles came in the PBA Women's Series, which ran from 2007 to 2010, and at the 2014 BPAA Women's All-Star.

List of professional titles 
Major championships are in bold type.
 2006 USBC Queens (Reno, Nevada)
 2007 Etonic Championship (Cheektowaga, New York)
 2009 Chameleon Championship (Allen Park, Michigan)
 2009 Scorpion Championship (Allen Park, Michigan)
 2014 BPAA Women's All-Star (Rockford, Illinois)
 2021 PWBA Tour Championship (Reno, Nevada)

Other Career Accomplishments 
Pluhowsky earned the United States Bowling Congress National High Average and High Series Awards for the 2017–2018 season as she set the record for the highest average for a season by a woman. She posted a 250.7 average over 71 games during the Inland Owls league at Capri Lanes in Kettering, Ohio. Pluhowsky was also:

Inducted into the World Bowling Writers Hall of Fame in 2012
 2011 World Bowling Writers Bowler of the Year
 2011 and 2015 Team USA Trials champion
 Three-time USBC Women's Championships titlist (2007 Classic Team, 2011 Scratch Singles, 2015 Diamond Team)
 2000-01 and 2004-05 Collegiate Player of the Year
 2000–01, 2001–02 and 2004–05 Collegiate All-America first team
 U.S. Amateur champion in 2001, 2003 and 2004
 2002 and 2004 World Bowling Writers Female Player of the Year
 1999, 2000 and 2001 USBC Junior Gold Championships winner

Personal 
Pluhowsky is married to massage therapist Carrie (Bland) Pluhowsky as of July, 2021. Shannon and Carrie each have children from previous relationships.

References 

1982 births
American ten-pin bowling players
People from Dayton, Ohio
University of Nebraska alumni
Living people
Pan American Games medalists in bowling
Pan American Games gold medalists for the United States
Pan American Games silver medalists for the United States
Bowlers at the 2003 Pan American Games
Bowlers at the 2015 Pan American Games
Bowlers at the 2019 Pan American Games
Competitors at the 2001 World Games
Medalists at the 2015 Pan American Games